White Mountain is a townland of 484 acres in County Antrim, Northern Ireland, 14.5 km south-west of Belfast. It is situated in the civil parish of Derriaghy and the historic barony of Massereene Upper.

The townland is named from White Mountain, a 250m high hill, on which there were extensive limestone quarries.

See also 
List of townlands in County Antrim
List of places in County Antrim

References

Townlands of County Antrim
Civil parish of Derriaghy